Queen Mary's House is a listed sixteenth century building in Jedburgh which is where Mary, Queen of Scots, stayed for a few weeks in 1566. The building has been open to the public since 1930 as a museum. There is some doubt whether the Queen stayed in this particular building. The museum has concentrated on telling Queen Mary's story for the last thirty years.

History

The house was built in the sixteenth century in the town of Jedburgh near the Jed Water. The original entrance to the house is thought to be from Canongate Bridge through what is not the garden.

The house was recorded in a watercolour by the astronomer and artist Nathaniel Everett Green.

In 1777 the house was the home of Dr Lindsay and his wife Jean. Ten years later their daughters were guides for Robert Burns when he visited Jedburgh. Dr Lindsay's grandson, Lieutenant General Robert Armstrong inherited the house in about 1819. He had entered the Russian army and became in time the head of the Saint Petersburg Mint. Robert allowed his aunts to occupy the house until 1869 when Elizabeth Armstrong died.

The house was painted by Arthur Perigal the younger in 1879. This fanciful painting places the building in a rural setting, rather than the town setting within which it has always stood.

The building was given to the town by the Debenhams director F. S. Oliver who was then living in nearby Edgerston in 1928. It was restored under the supervision of the architect John Wilson Paterson of Edinburgh. It was opened to the public in 1930 by Mrs Oliver. In 1971 it became a Category A listed building.

Description

It is a three-storey stone-built building with a four-storey tower. The roof was originally thatched and it was later covered with tiles.

Mary, Queen of the Scots, came with her entourage to Jedburgh in October 1566 to hold a court. She paid £40 to hire a house. Whilst she was in Jedburgh she heard that James Hepburn, 4th Earl of Bothwell, lay injured at Hermitage Castle. She took a hazardous journey to see him and returned ill from the experience. Fruits considered as medicine, including pomegranates and lemons or limes were sent from Edinburgh for the queen. She was said to have later noted that she should have died in Jedburgh, as after that her life became worse. She didn't die but she was forced to abdicate. She tried to escape to England, but she was imprisoned and, much later, executed. For the last thirty years Queen Mary's House has told this story.

The building is open to the public and there is no charge. Visitors can tour the inside via a stone spiral staircase. In each of the rooms are artefacts and boards explaining the history of the building and the background to Queen Mary's life and eventual execution.  The extensive grounds include pear trees that were planted in the 21st century. The trees are of the variety that were grown in the area when the farming of pears was a major occupation in the town.

Today the roofs are finished with grey slate.

References

Jedburgh
Tower houses in Scotland
Museums in the Scottish Borders